The Singapore Women's Tennis Exhibition is a women's exhibition tennis tournament held in Singapore at the Singapore Indoor Stadium, during the Friday - Sunday before Christmas.  It is a year-ending tournament.

The tournament is played under the traditional format, with 6 players invited to participate, where the top two players would receive automatic qualification into the semi-finals, whereas the other 4 players would compete in qualifying rounds for the other 2 places in the semi-finals.

Finals

See also
 List of tennis tournaments

External links
 Official website

Tennis tournaments in Singapore
Exhibition tennis tournaments
Women's sports competitions in Singapore